Picryl chloride is an organic compound with the formula ClC6H2(NO2)3.  It is a bright yellow solid that is highly explosive, as is typical for polynitro aromatics such as picric acid. Its detonation velocity is 7,200 m/s.

Reactions
The reactivity of picryl chloride is strongly influenced by the presence of three electron-withdrawing nitro groups.  Consequently picryl chloride is an electrophile as illustrated by its reactivity toward sulfite to give the sulfonate:
ClC6H2(NO2)3  +  Na2SO3  →   NaO3SC6H2(NO2)3  +  NaCl

Picryl chloride is also a strong electron acceptor. It forms a 1:1 charge-transfer complex with hexamethylbenzene.

References

Explosive chemicals
Nitrobenzenes